The Pakistan national cricket team toured India in the winter of 1960–61. They played five Test matches against the India national cricket team, and also played against several local Indian squads.

Background 
Writing for The Indian Express cricketer Abdul Hafeez Kardar who played for both India and Pakistan maintained that if Pakistan "does well in the first two test matches", they would go on to win the series. He felt that the visiting side had the "strongest batting power house ever to be sent out" by Pakistan and that Hanif Mohammad, "the most matured opener of the game", would the main "hurdle" for India.

Squads

The Indian squad for the series was announced on 30 November 1960. Rajasthan's all-rounder Rusi Surti was the only new inclusion in the squad. Vijay Manjrekar and Subhash Gupte made their comeback to the squad after a year. It was reported that the Pakistan squad would be announced only an hour before commencement of the First Test. To their squad announced before the First test,  Ijaz Butt, Shujauddin Butt, Mohammad Munaf and Intikhab Alam were added for the first-class game against Central Zone.

Test series

1st Test

Pakistan won the toss and elected to bat first on what was described as a pitch without the "usual grass" on it while staying "firm" and with "little dew".

2nd Test

The Indian team selectors made changes to the squad following the First Test; wicket-keeper Naren Tamhane, V. M. Muddiah, Salim Durani were included in place of Pankaj Roy, Nana Joshi and Ajit Wadekar. The Pakistani side included Alimuddin.

3rd Test

Leading up to the Third Test, pacer Surendranath was included in the Indian squad while Pankaj Roy was dropped. Pakistan made one change in the team that played the Second Test; Intikhab Alam replaced Alimuddin. A "grassy wicket" aiding bowlers, both seamers and spinners, was expected before the game.

4th Test

The Indian selectors included Datta Gaekwad and Baloo Gupte in place of Abbas Ali Baig, Bapu Nadkarni and Subhash Gupte after the Third Test. Further, following the first-class game between Pakistan and Indian Board President's XI, wicket-keeper Budhi Kunderan and Vijay Mehra were added to the squad. Showers were predicted on the day one of the Test following intermittent rains on the day preceding the game.

5th Test

In the Indian side that played the Fourth Test and the squad, Datta Gaekwad, Surendranath, Baloo Gupte and Naren Tamhane were replaced with Indrajitsinhji, Prakash Poddar, Bapu Nadkarni and Vaman Kumar for the Fifth.

Broadcast
The series was aired on All India Radio for Indian listeners. For the Second Test the Maharajkumar of Vizianagram, Devraj Puri and V. K. Chakrapani served as commentators, while for the Fourth Test, the Maharaja was accompanied by Pearson Surita and P. Ananda Rau, and Pakistan's Omar Kureishi as the guest commentator.

References

External links
 Tour homepage at ESPN Cricinfo archives
 

1960 in Indian cricket
1960 in Pakistani cricket
1961 in Indian cricket
1961 in Pakistani cricket
Indian cricket seasons from 1945–46 to 1969–70
International cricket competitions from 1960–61 to 1970
1960-61